Festy Oseiwe Ebosele (born 2 August 2002) is an Irish professional footballer who plays as a right-back or winger for Serie A club Udinese.

Early years
Ebosele was born in the town of Enniscorthy in County Wexford, Ireland to Nigerian parents. He began playing football for Moyne Rangers in 2010 before joining the academy of League of Ireland side Bray Wanderers when he was 14-years-old. Two years later in 2018, he signed for English Championship side Derby County.

Club career

Derby County
Ebosele made his debut for Derby County as a substitute in a 2–0 FA Cup loss to Chorley on 9 January 2021. He was one of fourteen players from Derby County's academy to make their debut in the game, after the entirety of Derby's first team squad and coaching team were forced to isolate due to a COVID-19 outbreak. He made his league debut as a substitute in a 1–0 loss to Norwich City on 10 April 2021. On 6 November 2021, Ebosele scored a first senior goal in a 1–1 draw at Millwall. In January 2022, Ebosele was linked to a move to Derby County's rivals Nottingham Forest, however Ebosele was said to have rejected the prospect of a move.

In March 2022, with Derby being unable to offer Ebosele new contract terms due to the restrictions put on the club by the EFL whilst in administration, it was confirmed that Ebosele would join Udinese at the end of his Derby contract in summer 2022, signing a five year deal with the Serie A club. In the weeks following the transfer, Derby manager Wayne Rooney questioned Ebosele's attitude and had him training with the Under-23 squad. Ebosele later got back into the team and finished the season with 37 appearances in all competitions, scoring two goals.

Udinese
On 21 March 2022, it was announced that Ebosele would join Italian Serie A club Udinese on a five-year contract starting in the summer of 2022. The transfer was confirmed by Derby County on 4 July, as the club was also entitled to compensation due to Ebosele's homegrown status.

International career
Born in Ireland, Ebosele is of Nigerian descent, so he could choose to represent either of the respective countries at international level. He has represented the Republic of Ireland at U16, U17, U19 and U21 levels ever since.

He then received his first call-up to the Irish senior national team on 25 May 2022, ahead of their UEFA Nations League games against Armenia, Ukraine and Scotland.

Career statistics

References

2002 births
Living people
Republic of Ireland association footballers
Republic of Ireland youth international footballers
Association football defenders
Association football fullbacks
Association football midfielders
English Football League players
Serie A players
Bray Wanderers F.C. players
Derby County F.C. players
Udinese Calcio players
Irish expatriate sportspeople in England
Republic of Ireland expatriate association footballers
Expatriate footballers in England
Irish expatriate sportspeople in Italy
Expatriate footballers in Italy
Irish people of Nigerian descent
Irish sportspeople of African descent
Black Irish sportspeople
Republic of Ireland under-21 international footballers